Niki Joseph Paul Alsford  is a British academic specializing in Taiwan studies.

Upon completing his bachelor's degree with honours at the University of Southampton, Alsford pursued a master's degree at National Chengchi University in Taiwan, followed by a doctorate at SOAS, University of London. He is a professor in Asia Pacific studies at the University of Central Lancashire. Alsford was nominated a fellow of the Royal Asiatic Society in 2013, a fellow of the Higher Education Academy in 2017, and a fellow of the Royal Anthropological Institute of Great Britain and Ireland in 2019.

References

Living people
Year of birth missing (living people)
Fellows of the Higher Education Academy
Fellows of the Royal Asiatic Society
Academics of the University of Central Lancashire
National Chengchi University alumni
Alumni of SOAS University of London
British expatriates in Taiwan
Fellows of the Royal Anthropological Institute of Great Britain and Ireland
Alumni of the University of Southampton
British orientalists